Dyspessa fuscula is a species of moth of the family Cossidae. It is found in Algeria and Tunisia.

References

Moths described in 1892
Dyspessa
Moths of Africa